The 1957 Moroccan Grand Prix (officially named the VI Grand Prix de Maroc) was a non-championship Formula One motor race held in 1957, with no points going towards the World Championship. It was held over 55 laps of the 7.651 km Ain-Diab Circuit on 27 October 1957.

This race was won by French driver Jean Behra in a Maserati 250F winning by 30.1 seconds, from British driver Stuart Lewis-Evans in a Vanwall VW5 in second place, and another French driver Maurice Trintignant finishing third in a BRM P25.

The race coincided with an outbreak of Asian flu amongst the Grand Prix community which explains the absence of Stirling Moss and the lacklustre performance of Fangio.

Classification

Grid

Race

Moroccan
Moroccan Grand Prix
Sport in Casablanca
1957 in Moroccan sport